Theebine railway station (formerly Kilkivan Junction) is a closed railway station on the North Coast railway line of Queensland, Australia at Theebine. Slightly south of the railway station is the junction between the main North Coast line and the Kingaroy branch, which continues into west Queensland. It is also the junction for the Dickabram line.

History 
Formerly Kilkivan Junction, it was named by the Railways Department as Theebine on 23 May 1910, using a Waka language word, dhil-bvain indicating the lung fish, Ceratodus Forsteri.

The Kingaroy to Theebine railway, opened in December 1904, was used for agriculture and commercial freight as well as transporting passengers and was one of the first branch lines built in Queensland. The Theebine to Kingaroy line was officially closed in early 2010.

References

Disused railway stations in Queensland
North Coast railway line, Queensland